FK Minija was a Lithuanian football team from town Kretinga.

History
Club founded in 1962. In soviet occupation period played in "A" klasė and Aukščiausia lyga (First tier).

The best season was in 1964, when team took third place in top division. In the same year team won Lithuanian football cup.

In Lithuanian Independence period team was in second or third tier.

In 2015 m. was in 16th position in Pirma lyga (second tier).

In 2016 m. had financial problems, in squad was lot of youngsters and team stayed at last position 16.

Achievements
A klasė: 0
 Third place: 1964

Lithuanian Cup:
Winners - 1
1964

Participation in Lithuanian Championships

Best seasons of Minija

Recent seasons of Minija

Participation in LFF Cup

In 2009/2010 LFF Cup season FK Minija was defeated in the third round by FK Nevėžis 1 – 5

References

Football clubs in Lithuania
1931 establishments in Lithuania
Association football clubs established in 1931
Sport in Kretinga